Schistura himachalensis is a species of ray-finned fish in the genus Schistura.

It is found in India.

Footnotes 

H
Cyprinid fish of Asia
Freshwater fish of India
Fish described in 1987